SWX Right Now (Sports and Weather Right Now) is a regional digital subchannel network broadcasting high school and college sports, and automated weather and news on Cowles Company-owned stations throughout Eastern Washington state, the Idaho Panhandle, and Montana. The channel airs over the secondary digital subchannels of Cowles' three NBC network affiliated stations in Eastern Washington, including KHQ-TV in Spokane, KNDO in Yakima and KNDU in Richland, as well as the third subchannel of KULR-TV in Billings, Montana. In addition, it is seen on most cable systems throughout the markets they serve.

Typical programming on SWX Right Now includes three-minute weather forecasts called The Weather Authority and sports segments titled SWX Sports Update. Programming carried includes Gonzaga University men's basketball; local high school and college football; Spokane Chiefs Western Hockey League games; Spokane Shock indoor football; and a sports commentary show from a studio located in "The Q" bar at the Northern Quest Resort & Casino in suburban Airway Heights.

Channels

Events

College
 Eastern Washington University football
 University of Idaho football
 Gonzaga University men's and women's basketball
 Crimson & Gray football scrimmage

Local events
 Armed Forces Torchlight Parade
 Bloomsday Race

Greater Spokane League high school basketball
 Rubber Chicken Lewis and Clark High School vs Joel E. Ferris High School Rivalry Basketball games & Spirit contest
 Groovy Shoes Shadle Park High School vs North Central High School (Spokane, Washington) Rivalry Basketball games & Spirit contest
 Stinky Sneaker University High School (Washington) vs Central Valley High School (Washington) Rivalry Basketball games & Spirit contest

Local sports
 Lamb Weston Columbia Cup (hydroplane racing)
 Spokane Chiefs hockey
 Tri-City Americans hockey

Sports shows

The Mark Few Show
A traditional weekly's coach's program featuring Gonzaga men's basketball coach Mark Few and Greg Heister discussing the week in Zags basketball, along with team features.

Toyota's Best Doggone Zags Show
A detailed analysis program about Zags basketball which airs Sunday and Monday nights.

Friday Night Lights
An extended traditional Friday night high school sports highlights show featuring teams throughout Eastern Washington and Northern Idaho. Hosted by Sam Adams and Matt Rogers.

SWX Tonight
A weeknight show that covers high school and college sports in the Montana area, as well as highlights from national sports. Hosted by Shaun Rainey and Zach Kaplan.

References

External links
SWX Right Now official website

Cowles Company
Sports television networks in the United States
Television channels and stations established in 2008
2008 establishments in Washington (state)
Mass media in Spokane, Washington
Television stations in Washington (state)